Julie Deborah Kavner (born September 7, 1950) is an American actress. Best known for her voice role as Marge Simpson on the animated television series The Simpsons, Kavner first attracted notice for her role as Brenda Morgenstern, the younger sister of Valerie Harper's title character in the sitcom Rhoda, for which she won a Primetime Emmy Award for Outstanding Supporting Actress in a Comedy Series. She also voices other characters for The Simpsons, including Marge's mother, Jacqueline Bouvier, and sisters Patty and Selma Bouvier.

Known for her improvisation and distinctive "honeyed gravel voice", Kavner was cast in her first professional acting role as Brenda Morgenstern in Rhoda in 1974. Starting in 1987, Kavner started appearing on The Tracey Ullman Show. The Tracey Ullman Show included a series of animated shorts about a dysfunctional family. Voices were needed for the shorts, and the producers asked Kavner to voice Marge. The shorts were spun off into The Simpsons.

Kavner has been described as "nearly reclusive"; part of her contract says that she will never have to promote The Simpsons on video. For her work as Marge, Kavner received another Primetime Emmy Award for Outstanding Voice-Over Performance in 1992 and an Annie Award nomination for her performance as the character in The Simpsons Movie.

Typically cast as a "woman who is supportive, sympathetic or self-effacingly funny", Kavner grew to dislike playing such roles. In 1992, she starred in This Is My Life, her first leading role in a feature film. Kavner has also appeared in live-action roles in six films written by Woody Allen and in the Adam Sandler comedy Click.

Early life
Kavner was born in Los Angeles, California, on September 7, 1950, the second daughter of Rose, a family counselor, and David Kavner, a furniture manufacturer, and grew up in Southern California. She decided to pursue a career in acting because "There was nothing else I wanted to do, ever". She attended Beverly Hills High School (which she later admitted she hated), where she was "something of a loner", and unsuccessfully tried out for several plays. John Ingle, formerly the chairman of the Beverly Hills High School art department, later commented that Kavner was "excellent at improvisation, but she wasn't an ingenue and not that castable at that age".

After graduating from high school, Kavner attended San Diego State University and majored in drama, being cast in several productions including a role as Charlotte Corday in Marat/Sade, becoming known for her improvisation and ability to do both comedy and drama. After graduating in 1971, she got a day job as a typist at the UCLA School of the Arts and Architecture.

Career

Early career
In 1973, Kavner auditioned for a role as one of Rhoda Morgenstern's sisters in The Mary Tyler Moore Show. David Davis, producer of the show, had convinced her to audition for the part, but decided to cast another actress instead. A year later, Rhoda Morgenstern became the leading character in a spin-off called Rhoda. Kavner was cast in her first professional acting role as Brenda Morgenstern, sister of the eponymous character. Rhoda ran on CBS from September 9, 1974, to December 1978. She received four Primetime Emmy Award nominations for Outstanding Continuing Performance by a Supporting Actress in a Comedy Series for playing Brenda, winning in 1978. She also received four Golden Globe Award nominations. In 1975, she received Daytime Emmy Award nomination for her starring role in the daytime special The Girl Who Couldn't Lose.

Following Rhoda, Kavner had a guest appearance on Taxi and appeared in the 1985 comedy Bad Medicine as well as the 1987 film Surrender, both of which were box office failures. She appeared in the television movies Revenge of the Stepford Wives, No Other Love and A Fine Romance, and shot a television pilot. She also starred in several stage plays, including a play called It Had to Be You at a dinner theater in Canada, Particular Friendships in New York City in 1981, and Two for the Seesaw, directed by Burt Reynolds. Woody Allen first saw Kavner one night while he was watching Rhoda in the 1970s. He thought that she was remarkable and later offered her a role in his 1986 film Hannah and Her Sisters. Kavner agreed, and credits Allen and the film with rejuvenating her career.

Kavner was then cast as a sidekick to Tracey Ullman in The Tracey Ullman Show, which debuted on Fox in 1987. Kavner described the show as, "like being back in school, a chance to play a wide variety of characters, some really vicious people, to not rest on laurels, to not play it safe". Kavner commented, "What I do is not mimicry or an impersonation, but more of an assimilation. [On The Tracey Ullman Show] we did a lot of looking at people to find out who to base our characters on. We did our homework on our lunch hour." She received four Primetime Emmy Award nominations for Best Individual Performance in a Variety or Music Program.

The Simpsons

Kavner became best known for her role as Marge Simpson on the animated television show The Simpsons, a show that continues to the present day. The Tracey Ullman Show included a series of animated shorts about the dysfunctional Simpson family. Voices were needed for the shorts, so the producers decided to ask Kavner and fellow cast member Dan Castellaneta to voice Marge and Homer rather than hire more actors. Kavner has what Hilary de Vries of The New York Times described as a "honeyed gravel voice". Kavner says her voice is due to "a bump on [her] vocal cords". Marge's voice has aged considerably throughout the series as Kavner has gotten older, and the higher register of Marge's voice in the earliest seasons had to be adjusted as it began to strain Kavner's voice.

Although Marge is her highest profile character on the show, Kavner's favorite characters to voice are Marge's sisters Patty and Selma Bouvier because "they're really funny and sad at the same time". Series creator Matt Groening instructed Kavner to voice the duo as characters who "suck the life out of everything". Both have similar raspy voices, but Patty's voice is more masculine and has a lower register, while Selma's voice is a little sweeter. Kavner also provides the voices of every other female member of the Bouvier family, including Marge's mother Jacqueline, Great-Aunt Gladys (a dead relative who was introduced on season four's "Selma's Choice"), and an unnamed grandmother seen on the season six episode "Fear of Flying".

Whilst cast members and crew have referenced Kavner as a deep fan of the series and the characters she voices, part of Kavner's contract says that she will never have to promote The Simpsons on video nor has she performed Marge's voice in public because she believes the publicity "destroys the illusion. People feel these are real people." Kavner takes recording sessions seriously, and feels that voice acting is "a little more limiting than live acting. And I have nothing to do with my character's movement." Nancy Cartwright, who voices Bart Simpson, said in her book My Life as a 10-Year-Old Boy that Kavner is a warm person who is "a workhorse of an actor" with "extraordinary professionalism and quiet work ethic", and notes that she is rarely late for recording sessions. Kavner has only one recorded interview in regard to her work on the show from 1992, describing Marge as "a wonderful person" with "a great sex life".

Until 1998, Kavner was paid $30,000 per episode. During a pay dispute in 1998, Fox threatened to replace the six main voice actors with new actors, going as far as preparing to cast new voices. However, the dispute was soon resolved and she received $125,000 per episode until 2004 when the voice actors demanded that they be paid $360,000 an episode. The issue was resolved a month later, and Kavner earned $250,000 per episode. After salary re-negotiations in 2008, the voice actors received approximately $400,000 per episode. Three years later, with Fox threatening to cancel the series unless production costs were cut, Kavner and the other cast members accepted a 30 percent pay cut, down to just over $300,000 per episode.

At the 44th Primetime Emmy Awards, Kavner received a Primetime Emmy Award for Outstanding Voice-Over Performance for voicing Marge in the season three episode "I Married Marge". In 2004, Kavner and Dan Castellaneta won a Young Artist Award for Most Popular Mom & Dad in a TV Series. For her performance in The Simpsons Movie, Kavner was nominated for Best Voice Acting in an Animated Feature at the 2007 Annie Awards, but Ian Holm from Ratatouille received the award. Kavner's emotional performance in the movie got positive reviews, and one critic said she "gave what must be the most heartfelt performance ever to find its way into a movie based on an irreverent cartoon". Some scenes in the movie, such as Marge's emotional video message to Homer, were recorded over 100 times, leaving Kavner exhausted.

Further career

Many of Kavner's roles have been described by New York Times writer Hilary de Vries as a "woman who is supportive, sympathetic, or self-effacingly funny". Kavner grew to despise playing such roles, saying "If it smacks of Brenda Morgenstern, I won't take the job." She had a supporting role as Eleanor Costello, a nurse who befriends Robin Williams' character in the Academy Award nominated film Awakenings. Kavner interviewed several nurses in preparation for the role, and Penny Marshall, the director of the film, described Kavner as "a low-maintenance actor [...] You never have to worry about giving [her] back-story for her characters." In 1992, Kavner starred in This Is My Life, her first leading role in a feature film. Kavner played Dottie Ingels, an aspiring stand-up comedian who starts neglecting her family when her career begins to take off. Kavner described Dottie as "really selfish" but admitted, "I liked the role for that very reason." Kavner had been asked to play a character with a smaller role in the film, but Joe Roth, at the time the chairman of 20th Century Fox, suggested that they cast a lesser known actress in the lead role. Nora Ephron, the writer of This Is My Life, said Kavner "has so little vanity that it is almost shocking. Not only does she have no demands as an actress – 'How big is my trailer, what's in my refrigerator?' – but she will do anything for the character if it makes sense to her."

Kavner has frequently appeared in Woody Allen films, having roles in Hannah and Her Sisters (1986), Radio Days (1987), New York Stories (1989), Alice (1990), Shadows and Fog (1991), the television movie Don't Drink the Water (1994) and Deconstructing Harry (1997). Allen described her as "a naturally funny person. When she does a scene, you listen to her and look at her, and the prism through which it's all filtered is funny." Kavner believes he is "a true filmmaker, one that has something to say, continually experimenting on different themes within his own film-making", adding that "anything [Allen] ever does, I always want to do, [...] I don't even have to read it."

She has done voice-over work in films such as The Lion King 1½, Dr. Dolittle and an uncredited role as an announcer in A Walk on the Moon. She was cast in as the mother of Adam Sandler's character in Click, released in 2006. She also worked with Tracey Ullman in the HBO sketch comedy series Tracey Takes On...

Personal life
Kavner is Jewish. She was born and raised in Southern California, but by 1992 had taken up residence in Manhattan, New York. Kavner leads a private, "nearly reclusive" life, "discreet and guarded beyond the usual reticent star routine". She rarely makes public appearances and refuses to be photographed at work, especially in the studio while doing The Simpsons. Her partner was producer David Davis; they lived together from 1976 until his death in 2022. At the time of his death, it was reported that Kavner was in fact his wife.

In 1983, it was reported in Current Biography that Kavner is an avid athlete and a pescetarian. 

In a 1992 interview with The New York Times, Kavner said she was considering retiring, "except for doing three days a year for Woody [Allen]", but felt that if she did retire, she would receive a script she wanted "to do more than life itself".

Filmography

Film

Television

Video games

Music videos

Theme parks

Awards

References

External links

 
 
 

1950 births
Living people
American film actresses
American television actresses
American video game actresses
American women comedians
American voice actresses
Jewish American actresses
Actresses from Los Angeles
Outstanding Performance by a Supporting Actress in a Comedy Series Primetime Emmy Award winners
San Diego State University alumni
20th-century American actresses
21st-century American actresses
21st-century American Jews